Attila Gyagya (born 30 March 1982 in Sighetu Marmaţiei, Maramureș County) is a Romanian football defender of Hungarian ethnicity. He currently plays for Kecskeméti TE. His former clubs are Szentesi TE and Orosháza FC. His dream is to play in the Hungary national football team

References

External links
Profile at HLSZ 

1982 births
Living people
People from Sighetu Marmației
Romanian sportspeople of Hungarian descent
Romanian footballers
Szentes FC footballers
Orosháza FC players
Kecskeméti TE players
Szolnoki MÁV FC footballers
Nemzeti Bajnokság I players
Romanian expatriate footballers
Expatriate footballers in Hungary
Romanian expatriate sportspeople in Hungary
Association football defenders